Soso Jabidze (born 14 August 1987 in Mayakovsky) is an amateur Georgian Greco-Roman wrestler, who competes in the men's heavyweight category. He won a bronze medal in his division at the 2010 European Wrestling Championships in Baku, Azerbaijan.

Jabidze represented Georgia at the 2012 Summer Olympics in London, where he competed in the men's 96 kg class. He received a bye for the preliminary round of sixteen match, before losing out to Albanian-born Bulgarian wrestler and world champion Elis Guri, with a three-set technical score (0–2, 1–0, 0–1), and a classification point score of 1–3.

References

External links
Profile – International Wrestling Database
NBC Olympics Profile

1987 births
Living people
Male sport wrestlers from Georgia (country)
Olympic wrestlers of Georgia (country)
Wrestlers at the 2012 Summer Olympics
People from Baghdati
21st-century people from Georgia (country)